Kay Simon (born 9 July 1978) is a German slalom canoeist who competed at the international level from 1995 to 2008.

He won four medals in the C2 team event at the ICF Canoe Slalom World Championships with three silvers (2002, 2003, 2006) and a bronze (1997). He won six more medals at the European Championships (3 golds, 1 silver and 2 bronzes).

His partner in the C2 boat throughout his career was his twin brother Robby Simon.

World Cup individual podiums

1 European Championship counting for World Cup points

References

German male canoeists
Living people
1978 births
Medalists at the ICF Canoe Slalom World Championships